Malaysia–Palestine relations (Jawi: هوبوڠن مليسيا–ڤلسطين) refers to bilateral foreign relations between the two countries, Malaysia and Palestine.

The relations between Malaysia and Palestine are strong brotherly relations. In 2012, there were approximately 3,000–5,000 Palestinian students in Malaysia, with many Palestinians also choosing Malaysia as a country for temporary refuge. With respect to the Israeli occupation of Palestinian territories, Malaysia has strongly stood up for the rights and freedoms of the Palestinians and has supported the struggles of the Palestinians. Malaysia also currently refuses to recognise the State of Israel until a peace agreement is reached to realise the two-state solution although Palestine lays claim to the former  borders of Mandatory Palestine.

On 31 August 2021, a western district in Gaza named one of its streets "Malaysia Street" in honour of Malaysia's support for Palestine. Furthermore, locals in Gaza also raised Malaysian flags to celebrate Merdeka Day.

Assassination of Fadi Mohammad al-Batsh in Malaysia 
On 21 April 2018, the Palestinian engineer, lecturer, and Hamas member Fadi Mohammad al-Batsh was gunned down by two men on a motorbike while heading to a mosque for dawn prayers. According to Israeli media, al-Batsch was an expert on rocket and drone accuracy, who had recently published material on drone development and transmitters for controlling drones. In response, Hamas issued a statement identifying al-Batsh as one of their own and blamed his death on the "hand of treachery." His relatives have blamed Israel for assassinating al-Batsch. The Malaysia's Deputy Prime Minister Dato' Seri Dr. Ahmad Zahid Hamidi has announced that the Malaysian Government would investigate the possibility that foreign agents were involved in his killing. Zahid described the assailants as two European or Middle Eastern men who were riding a powerful BMW 1100cc motorbike. Israel has so far denied involvement in al-Batsh's assassination.

References 

Palestine
Bilateral relations of the State of Palestine